Kalanta is an EP by popular Greek artist Despina Vandi. It was released on 22 November 2006 by Heaven Music. The album went double platinum. Kalanta was the best selling CD single for 2006 by a female artist.

Track listing

Singles
"Kalanta"
"Kalanta" was the first single released from the EP and a music video was made.

"Mehri Mai Mina"
"Mehri Mai Mina" was the second single release from the EP and a music video was made.

Charts

Kalanta peaked at number one on the Greek Singles Chart (where EPs chart in Greece) and stay there for 5 weeks.  The EP was certified double platinum, selling 31,000 units.

Credits and personnel

Personnel
 Hakan Binkolou - cubus, sazi
 Akis Diximos - background vocals
 Pantelis Gkertsos - solo guitar
 Giorgos Hatzopoulos - guitars (acoustic, twelve-string, electric)
 Trifon Koutsourelis - orchestration, programming, keyboards
 Giannis Mpithikotsis - bouzouki, baglama, tzoura, lute
 Phoebus - music, lyrics, orchestration, programming, keyboards
 Giorgos Roilos - percussion
 Penelope Skalkotou from Spiros Lambrou's Children's Choir - vocals
 Despina Vandi - vocals
 Thanasis Vasilopoulos - ney, clarinet, mismas

Production
 Thodoris Hrisanthopoulos - mastering
 Vasilis Nikolopoulos - sound, mixing
 Phoebus - production manager
 Vaggelis Siapatis - sound, computer editing
 Giorgos Stampolis - production
 Leon Zervos - mastering

Design
 Alexandra Katsaiti - styling
 Stefanos Vasilakis - hair
 Manos Vinihakis - make up
 Tasos Vrettos - cover photo

Credits adapted from the album's liner notes.

Official remixes
 2006: Jingle bells (Kalanta English Version)
 2007: Ta Lefta (Remix)
 2007: An De M' Agapas (DJ NV NRG Mix)

Cover versions
2007: Anelia - Dyh (Κάλαντα; Анелия - Дъх) (Bulgaria)
2007: Teodora - Smeshna cena (Τα λεφτά; Теодора - Смешна Цена) (Bulgaria)

References

Despina Vandi EPs
2006 EPs
Music videos directed by Kostas Kapetanidis
Number-one singles in Greece